UA, U-A, Ua, uA, or ua may refer to:

Arts and entertainment

Gaming
 Unearthed Arcana, a Dungeons & Dragons sourcebook
 Unknown Armies, a role playing game
 Urban Assault, a first-person shooter and real-time strategy computer game

Music 
 Ua (born 1972), a Japanese singer-songwriter
 United Abominations, an album by the band Megadeth

Other uses in arts and entertainment 
 United Artists, a film studio
 The Umbrella Academy, a graphic novel by Gerard Way

Businesses and organizations
 Uitgesloten aansprakelijkheid (lit. "excluded liability"), a Dutch form of cooperative, which has legal personality, but with members (at least two on incorporation) rather than shareholders, with no capital and therefore no minimum capital or equity requirement, and with articles of association that can be worded such that members are not liable for the actions performed by the Cooperative (or losses suffered), usually used as a holding or finance company
 ultrAslan, a fan group of the Galatasaray Spor Kulübü football team
 Under Armour, an American clothing brand
 Union Association, a baseball league of 1884
 United Airlines, a major American airline headquartered in Chicago, Illinois (whose IATA airline designator is also UA)
 United Artists, a film studio
 United Association, a plumbing and pipefitting labor union in the U.S. and Canada
 Universal Audio (company), a designer and manufacturer of audio signal processing hardware and software
 University Alliance, a lobbying group of British universities
 UP Aerospace, a private spaceflight company based in Denver, Colorado

Military uses
 German submarine UA, a German submarine of the Second World War
 German Type UA submarine, of the First World War
 , a World War I submarine of Imperial Germany
 Unauthorized Absence, a key term for the abandonment of a duty or post without permission (United States)
 Future Force Unit of Action, a proposed US Army tactical unit

Places
 ua, ISO country code for Ukraine
 , Ligurian for the Italian commune of Ovada
 Upper Arlington, Ohio

Schools
 University of Akron, a public research university in Akron, Ohio, United States
 University of Alabama, a public research university located in Tuscaloosa, Alabama, United States
 University of Alaska system, a university system in Alaska created in 1975
 University of Alaska Anchorage, the largest university by enrollment in the system
 University of Alaska Fairbanks, the first university and flagship (known from 1925 to 1975 simply as the University of Alaska)
 University of Alaska Southeast, located in the capital city of Juneau, and the smallest by enrollment
 University of Alicante, a public university in Alicante, Spain
 University of Antwerp, one of the major Belgian universities located in the city of Antwerp
 University of Arizona, a public research university in Tucson, Arizona, United States
 University of Arkansas, a public, co-educational, land-grant, space-grant, research university in Fayetteville, Arkansas, United States

Science and technology

Biology and medicine
 Unstable angina, a type of heart disease
 Uric acid, a metabolic compound
 Urinalysis (also U/A), a set of medical diagnostic tests performed on urine

Computing and telecommunications
 .ua, the Internet country code top-level domain (ccTLD) for Ukraine
 User agent, a computer networking software class
 User Assistance, computer programme manuals and documentation
 Universal Acceptance, a term to represent the principle that accepts all the email addresses with every Top-level domain (TLD).

Other uses in science and technology
 Unmanned aircraft or unmanned aerial vehicle (UAV), an aircraft without a human pilot aboard (commonly known as a drone)
 Microampere (uA, properly µA), a unit of electric current defined as one-millionth of an ampere
 UA, the product of a heat exchanger's Overall Heat Transfer Coefficient U and its active exchange area A in thermodynamics

Other uses
 Unit of account, a nominal monetary unit of measure or currency used to represent the real value (or cost) of any economic item (in economics), or the words that are used to describe the specific assets and liabilities that are reported in financial statements rather than the units used to measure them (in financial accounting)
 Unitary authority, a type of local authority that has a single tier and is responsible for all local government functions within its area, or performs additional functions which elsewhere in the relevant country are usually performed by national government or a higher level of sub-national government
 Urban area, a human settlement with high population density and infrastructure of built environment

See also
 U of A (disambiguation)
 Ursuline (disambiguation)